Killer Burger is an American restaurant chain. The company was founded by Thomas "TJ" Southard in Portland, Oregon. John Dikos currently serves as chief executive officer. There were 19 locations in Oregon, Idaho, and Washington as of April 2022, including high-profile, non-traditional locations at Portland's Moda Center and Providence Park.

LaMichael James, a former player in the National Football League and for the Oregon Ducks, owns two franchises, one in Lake Oswego and another in Beaverton.

See also
 List of hamburger restaurants

References

External links

 

Hamburger restaurants
Restaurants in Oregon
Restaurants in Beaverton, Oregon
Restaurants in Lake Oswego, Oregon